Cuando vivas conmigo (English title: Against Our Destiny) is a Colombian telenovela produced and broadcast by Caracol Televisión, starring Caterin Escobar, Diego Trujillo, Sandra Reyes, Christian Tappan, Linda Lucía Callejas, María José Vargas, Diego Garzón, Norma Nivia and Juan Manuel Lenis. It premiered on September 19, 2016 and concluded on January 6, 2017.

Cast 
 Caterin Escobar as Armida López
  María José Vargas as Young Armida López
 Diego Trujillo as Ismael Herrera
 Sandra Reyes as Gertrudis López
  Karen Novoa as Young Gertrudis López
 Christian Tappan as Felicito Yanequé
 Linda Lucía Callejas as Josefa Méndez
 Diego Garzón as Miguel Yanequé
 Norma Nivia as Magdalena Herrera
 Juan Manuel Lenis as Ignacio "Escobita" Herrera
 José Daniel Cristancho as Tiburcio Yanequé
 Freddy Ordóñez as Sergeant Carlos Alberto Lituma
 Víctor Hugo Morant as Captain Óscar Silva
 Fernando Lara as Father Pepín Odonoban
 Kimberly Reyes as Mabel Barraza Muñoz
 Gary Forero as Foncho Martínez
 Ana Victoria Beltrán as Martha Contreras
 Tatiana Rentería as Lucila
 Juan Carlos Messier as Claudio
 Luis Fernando Salas as Narciso Veranda
 Juan Pablo Obregón as Albeiro Jaramillo
 Alex Adames as Gerardo
 Tatiana Arango as Johanna Rodríguez
 Laura Peñuela as Aurora
 Santiago Moure as Orlando Camargo
 Inés Oviedo as Briggith
 Juan David Galindo as Rigoberto
 Luz Stella Luengas Díaz as Dalila Romero
 Zulma Muñoz Ruiz as Constanza
 Alberto León Jaramillo as Francisco "Don Pacho" Martínez
 Alejandro Gutiérrez as Colorado Bignolo
 Katherine Castrillón as Margarita Manrique
 Lady Noriega as the muse
 Juana del Río as "La Silenciosa"
 Diego Armando Landaeta as Luis Veranda
 Shirley Gómez as Andrea
 Isabel Cristina Villarreal
 Ana Sofía Jiménez
 María Irene Toro

Awards and nominations

References

External links 
 Dua Takdir Cinta at Astro Prima

Remake 
Cuando Vivas Conmigo was remade as Dua Takdir Cinta in Malaysia by Global Station Sdn Bhd which last episode premieres 6 April 2020.

2016 telenovelas
2016 Colombian television series debuts
2017 Colombian television series endings
Caracol Televisión telenovelas
Colombian telenovelas
Spanish-language telenovelas
Television shows set in Bogotá
Mario Vargas Llosa